Iron cobra may refer to:
Iron Cobra, a Canadian improv comedy duo
Iron cobra, a monster in the tabletop roleplaying game Dungeons & Dragons